Ben Feldman (born May 27, 1980) is an American actor and producer. Throughout his career, Feldman has undertaken roles on stage, including the Broadway play The Graduate along with more prominent roles in television series such as his role as Jonah Simms in the NBC sitcom Superstore. He has also played lead characters in films including The Perfect Man with Hilary Duff.

Early life and education
Feldman was born on May 27, 1980 in Potomac, Maryland. His mother is Marcia Muir Mitchell, a writer, and his father is Robert "Bob" Feldman, who runs a Maryland advertising agency. His stepmother is Kris Feldman, a realtor. Feldman is from a Jewish family and attended Conservative Jewish and Orthodox Jewish synagogues and schools. He has a sister, Morgan Leiter, who works in fashion. His aunt through his stepmother, Susan Feniger, is a chef in Los Angeles.

He was involved in acting camp and school theater from the age of 6. He attended Winston Churchill High School in Potomac, Maryland and graduated with the class of 1998. He worked as a camp counselor in the theater and taught a videography class for several summers in Bethesda, and attended Ithaca College in New York, where he received a Bachelor of Fine Arts in acting.

After graduating, he moved to New York City, where he performed on Broadway and eventually moved to Los Angeles to act in film and television.

Career 

From 2009 to 2011, he was a regular on the television series Drop Dead Diva in the role of guardian angel Fred before leaving the series at the start of the fourth season. In April 2012, he joined the cast of AMC's Mad Men as a regular, playing the character Michael Ginsberg. He also appeared as lawyer Ron LaFlamme on HBO's Silicon Valley from 2014 to 2019, and from 2015 to 2021 played the lead Jonah Simms in the NBC sitcom Superstore. He also produced Superstore in 2019-2021. In 2021, he starred as Tylor Tuskmon in Disney's Monsters at Work.

Other pursuits
Feldman is co-owner of a wine label, Angelica Cellars.

Personal life
Feldman lives in Los Angeles. In 2012, he became engaged to Michelle Mulitz. They were married on October 12, 2013, at Smokey Glen Farm in Gaithersburg, Maryland. The couple have two children; son Charlie Milton, born October, 2017, and daughter Effie, born May, 2019.

Filmography

Film

Television

References

External links
 
 
 Angelica Cellars
 Ben Feldman's biography on Filmbug

1980 births
Living people
21st-century American male actors
American male film actors
American male stage actors
American male television actors
Ithaca College alumni
Jewish American male actors
Male actors from Washington, D.C.
People from Potomac, Maryland
21st-century American Jews